The tata of Sikasso, known locally as  tarakoko, is a series of  ramparts initially constructed in Sikasso under the reign of Tiéba Traoré (king of Kénédougou), from 1877 to 1897, to resist the raids of Samory Touré. It was  later enlarged by his brother  Babemba Traoré.

Description
At its apogee, the tata consisted of :

 a middle fortress with smaller and thinner walls, intended to destinée à isoler les marchands, soldiers and nobles;
 an innermost enclosure encircling the Dionfoutou, the part of the city inhabited by the king and his family.

The remains of the fortress are today visible in the layout of the city of Sikasso in different neighborhoods including: Mancourani, Médine, Wayerma, Bougoula town and Fulaso. and the districts Mancourani, Médine, Wayerma, Bougoula ville and Fulaso.

See also

 Kénédougou Kingdom
 Mamelon of Sikasso

References

Bibliography
 Alpha Oumar Konare, Sikasso Tata, Éditions Jamana, Bamako, 1998, 111 p., 

History of Mali
Architecture in Mali